Aequidens is a genus of fish in the family Cichlidae found in South America. Formerly a wastebasket genus, as presently defined Aequidens is largely restricted to the Amazon Basin, Orinoco Basin and river basins in The Guianas. The only exceptions are A. plagiozonatus which also occurs in the Paraná Basin, and A. tetramerus which also occurs in the Parnaíba River.

Taxonomy
Many species formerly placed in this genus have been reallocated to other genera such as Andinoacara, Bujurquina, Cleithracara, Krobia, Laetacara, Rondonacara and Tahuantinsuyoa.

Species
There are currently 17 recognized species in this genus:

 Aequidens chimantanus Inger, 1956
 Aequidens diadema (Heckel, 1840)
 Aequidens epae S. O. Kullander, 1995
 Aequidens gerciliae S. O. Kullander, 1995
 Aequidens mauesanus S. O. Kullander, 1997
 Aequidens metae C. H. Eigenmann, 1922 
 Aequidens michaeli S. O. Kullander, 1995
 Aequidens pallidus (Heckel, 1840) (Doublespot acara)
 Aequidens paloemeuensis S. O. Kullander & Nijssen, 1989
 Aequidens patricki S. O. Kullander, 1984
 Aequidens plagiozonatus S. O. Kullander, 1984
 Aequidens potaroensis C. H. Eigenmann, 1912
 Aequidens rondoni (A. Miranda-Ribeiro, 1918)
 Aequidens superomaculatum Hernández-Acevedo, Machado-Allison & Lasso A., 2015
 Aequidens tetramerus (Heckel, 1840) (Saddle cichlid)
 Aequidens tubicen S. O. Kullander & E. J. G. Ferreira, 1991
 Aequidens viridis (Heckel, 1840)

References

 
Cichlasomatini
Freshwater fish genera
Taxa named by Carl H. Eigenmann
Taxa named by William L. Bray